The Johns Hopkins–Navy lacrosse rivalry is an intercollegiate lacrosse rivalry between the Johns Hopkins Blue Jays and Navy Midshipmen. While historical rivals in football, the lacrosse series has been the headlining competition between the two universities. The Maryland programs were both national powers prior to NCAA sponsorship of the sport, with 35 national titles for the Blue Jays and 17 for the Midshipmen. They both continue to rank one-two in the most total national championships of any program in collegiate lacrosse. While both mainstays on the national stage in the modern era, Hopkins has dominated Navy head-to-head, winning 36 consecutive from 1975 to 2009. The series, annual since 1950 was halted in 2017 due to scheduling issues from conference realignment, as the longtime independents joined the Patriot League and Big Ten Conference respectively in the last decade. A 2020 renewal was cancelled due to the COVID-19 pandemic. As of 2020, Johns Hopkins leads the series 62–27–1.

Series history

Early years (1900s to 1960s) 
Johns Hopkins bested the Midshipmen in the inaugural meeting by a score of 6 to 1. Navy gained its first win in the series in 1910, as the game was played on a semi-annual basis through 1928. The Midshipmen defeated the Jays in 1928 and would share the USILA Gold Medal with Johns Hopkins, Maryland, and Rutgers. The hiatus began with a relatively even series; Navy led 9–7–1. The two would reconcile in 1943 in Annapolis, before resuming the series in 1946 and playing annually from 1949 to 2017.

Post-World War II resumption began with five consecutive Jays victories, their longest streak to that point. Notably, the state rivals did not meet during the 1949 campaign, as the Navy ended with an undefeated 11–0 record but had to settle for a split national championship with Hopkins. Navy would respond by reeling off four straight victories over Hopkins, but the Jays would counter by winning the next three. Up to this point, both teams were title contenders each season, with Hopkins winning five titles and Navy winning three since resumption. 1959 marked a crucial turning point. Johns Hopkins would claim the national title, but Navy downed the Jays 13–11 to deny them a perfect season. This was the first of eight consecutive Midshipmen victories under coach Willis Bilderback, their longest streak in the rivalry. The last seven of these coincided with Navy national titles and preeminence over the sport. In 1967, Johns Hopkins broke the streak with a 9–6 defeat of Navy, but the teams would ultimately share the USILA championship with Maryland. 1969 featured a three-goal victory for the Midshipmen in Baltimore, the most recent time that they have won the rivalry game on the road at Homewood Field. In 1970, Navy and the Jays would again share the title, this time with Virginia, as Hopkins handed Navy their only defeat on the season.

Hopkins dominance (1970s through 2000s) 
1971 marked the first year in the NCAA Division I Men's Lacrosse Championship era. Though a Division III program in most sports, Hopkins was grandfathered into Division I for men's lacrosse, enabling the Navy rivalry to continue. That 1971 season the teams played a rare neutral matchup, held in Houston, the first college lacrosse game ever played in the state of Texas. Played in front of nearly 20,000 spectators at the Astrodome to set a single-game NCAA attendance record, the game has been credited for increasing Texan interest in the sport. Navy felled the Jays, as they finished with a rare losing season at 3–7 and missed the inaugural tournament. Hopkins would win its first NCAA title in 1974 but dropped its regular season matchup with Navy. The #6 Midshipmen upset the #2 Jays 13–12 in Annapolis. The next year would not be as successful against Hopkins for Navy, losing 16–11, but the Midshipmen would end the season as the national runner-up.

That matchup in 1974 would be the last for Navy against their in-state rivals for 36 years. The streak is further unprecedented by the fact that the Midshipmen were consistently good on the national stage. From the introduction of the USILA polls in 1973, all but one Hopkins–Navy meeting was between two Top 10 teams until the 1990 contest. All games were between ranked teams until 1996, when Navy entered unranked. The nature of the streak carries comparisons with Navy's college football rivalry with Notre Dame, in which the Fighting Irish defeated the Midshipmen for 43 consecutive years, the longest streak between Division I opponents in NCAA history. Navy ended that dubious distinction in 2007 with a 46–44 triple overtime victory and would finally end their losing steak against Hopkins several years later.

Recent years (2010–present) 
2010 would mark the season that Navy finally got over the hump against their rivals. Prior to the game, longtime Midshipmen coach Richie Meade told his players "You’re Midshipmen at the Naval Academy, your future leaders and people’s lives are going to be in your hands. You understand the mission, you understand what you’re required to do, and now I want you to go out and get it done." Navy rallied from an early five goal deficit, scoring six in the second quarter to take a narrow lead into halftime. After a spirited second half, the game went to overtime tied at eight. Since 2000, three Blue Jays victories came in overtime and 2010 would go down the same route. However, this time Navy prevailed in the extra session to win 9–8.

Two seasons later, the Midshipmen put on a spectacular defensive display, holding Hopkins to just two goals in an 8–2 victory. The Jays would win the next five, including a double overtime victory in 2016. The 2017 contest was the first between Top 10 teams since 2008, as the Jays rolled to a comfortable seven goal victory. After that game, the series took a two-year hiatus due to scheduling concerns between the schools, in part due to their recent decisions to join conferences, giving up their historical independent status. A renewal was scheduled in 2020 but the game, along with the entire NCAA season, was cancelled due to concerns stemming from the COVID-19 pandemic. The future of the series remains uncertain.

Rival accomplishments
The following summarizes the accomplishments of the two programs.

Game results

References

College lacrosse rivalries in the United States
Johns Hopkins Blue Jays men's lacrosse
Navy Midshipmen men's lacrosse